Lieutenant General Sir William Francis Robert Turner KBE CB DSO (1907–1989) was a senior British Army officer active during the Second World War and the late 1950s and early 1960s.

Military career
William Turner was commissioned into the King's Own Scottish Borderers in 1928.

He served in World War II with his Regiment which formed part of the British Expeditionary Force to France in 1939. He was Commandant of the Junior Leaders School from 1940 to 1941. In 1942 he was appointed Commanding Officer of 5th Bn King's Own Scottish Borderers, a post he held for the remainder of the War.

After the War he went with his Regiment to Palestine for a while. He then held various General Staff Officer (GSO) positions before becoming Commander of the British Military Mission to Greece in 1950. He was then made Commander of 128th Infantry Brigade in 1952. He was Brigadier on the General Staff at Headquarters Western Command from 1954 and was then appointed General Officer Commanding (GOC) of the 44th (Home Counties) Division and Home Counties District in 1956. He was also Deputy Constable of Dover Castle at that time.

In 1959 he became President of the Regular Commissions Board and in 1961 he was appointed General Officer Commanding-in-Chief Scottish Command and Governor of Edinburgh Castle: he retired in 1964.

References

|-
 

1907 births
1989 deaths
British Army lieutenant generals
British Army personnel of World War II
Knights Commander of the Order of the British Empire
Companions of the Order of the Bath
Companions of the Distinguished Service Order
King's Own Scottish Borderers officers
British military personnel of the Palestine Emergency